Wabulacinus ridei lived during the early Miocene in Riversleigh. It is named after David Ride, who made the first revision of thylacinid fossils. The material was found in system C of the Camel Spurtum assembledge.

W. ridei was a carnivorous, quadrupedal marsupial in Australia. In appearance it resembled a dog with a long snout. Its molar teeth were specialized for carnivory; the cups and crest were reduced or elongated to give the molars a cutting blade.

W. ridei is known from a right maxillary fragment (QMF 16851) containing molars one and two to the anterior section of the infraorbital foramen that was dorsal to the third molar.  The left dentary fragment (QMF 16852) contains a partial second premolar and a full third molar. Premolar 3 and molars one and two are missing with the alveolus intact, no material remains after molar three.

Muirhead (1997 p. 372) describes W. ridei as having the following features that are unique: parametacrista on the first molar is straight, entoconid either missing of combined with the hypoconid in a more posterior position, the loss or reduction of styler crests, small metaconid, talonid basin reduced by the lingual (toward the tongue) placement of the hypoconid. Dasyurid type features include the infraorbital foramen away from the jugal  and a large hypoconid. Only one feature of the tooth links this species to Ngamalacinus, and that is the metaconid and protoconid are reduced. Features that are in common with the genus Thylacinus are the centrocrista is straight on the first upper molar, the angle of the crest at the paracone and metacone is wider than plesiomorphic thylacinidae and the loss of metaconid and further widening of the crests increasing the size of the talonid (back half of the tooth).

Taxonomy 
The description of the species emerged from an examination of fossils by Jeanette Muirhead, published in 1997, that assigned the species to a new genus. The name of the genus, Wabulacinus, combines a Waanyi word Wabula, meaning "long ago", and the ancient Greek stem word kynos, dog, used for the genus Thylacinus and family Thylacinidae.
The specific epithet honours the contributions of David Ride to Australian palaeontology.
The holotype is a fossilised fragment of the right maxillary, retaining the first and second molar, with other material collected at the same site being assigned to the same species. The type location is the "Camel Sputum Site" at the Riversleigh World Heritage Area.

Classification 
A monotypic genus, the arrangement within the family of thylacinids may be summarised as,

Family Thylacinidae, extinct
Genus Badjcinus
Genus Maximucinus
Genus Muribacinus
Genus Mutpuracinus
Genus Ngamalacinus
Genus Nimbacinus
Genus Thylacinus
Genus Tyarrpecinus
Genus Wabulacinus
Wabulacinus ridei (Late Oligocene — Early Miocene)

References

External links

Natural Worlds

Prehistoric thylacines
Miocene mammals of Australia
Miocene marsupials
Riversleigh fauna
Prehistoric marsupial genera